My Bloody Valentine, an alternative rock band from Dublin, Ireland, have recorded songs for three studio albums and a number of extended plays, singles and compilation releases. Formed in 1983 by Kevin Shields, Colm Ó Cíosóig and David Conway, the band had a series of unsuccessful releases throughout the mid-1980s on various independent record labels. In 1987, after the addition of bassist Debbie Googe and vocalist-guitarist Bilinda Butcher, My Bloody Valentine released "Strawberry Wine", Ecstasy, and the 1988 EP You Made Me Realise, which were predecessors to the band's debut album Isn't Anything (1988). Considered an independent success, the band released two further EPs before Loveless (1991), their second studio album; which is considered their magnum opus and which received unanimous critical acclaim since its release. Both albums pioneered an alternative rock subgenre known as shoegazing, a term coined by Sounds journalists to describe certain bands' "motionless performing style, where they stood on stage and stared at the floor". My Bloody Valentine disbanded in 1997 after failing to utilise a third album although Kevin Shields was rumoured to have sent 60 hours' worth of material to Island Records, with whom the band signed after being dropped by Creation Records in 1991. My Bloody Valentine reunited in 2007 and began completing their third album. The album, m b v, was self-released in 2013 and received "universal acclaim", according to Metacritic.

The band were unsuccessful during their early career, with reviews of their initial releases being unanimously negative. My Bloody Valentine first experienced chart success with their EP The New Record by My Bloody Valentine (1986), which entered the UK Independent Singles Chart at number 22. Their successive releases, 1987's "Sunny Sundae Smile", "Strawberry Wine" and Ecstasy all placed in the independent charts, along with "Feed Me with Your Kiss", "Soon", "To Here Knows When" and Isn't Anything, which peaked at number 1 upon its release. Loveless is the most commercially successful of the band's releases—it peaked at number 24 in the UK Albums Chart and has sold over 290,000 copies in the United States, according to Nielsen SoundScan.

Among some of My Bloody Valentine's best-known songs are "Only Shallow", a song which includes notable use of Kevin Shields' "glide guitar" technique; "Sometimes", which was featured on the soundtrack to the 2003 film Lost in Translation; "Soon", a duet which incorporates elements of dance music; and "You Made Me Realise", which during live performances features an interlude of noise and excessive feedback known as "the holocaust", which has often lasted for half an hour and reached 130 db.

Songs

See also
My Bloody Valentine discography
Kevin Shields discography

Notes

References

Bibliography

My Bloody Valentine
My Bloody Valentine (band) songs